Tayshan Sami Hayden-Smith is a footballer who plays as a midfielder for Bedfont Sports. Born in England, he is a Cascadia international. Besides England, he has played in Austria and Cyprus. He previously played for Grenfell Athletic.

Career

Club career

Before the second half of 2016–17, Hayden-Smith signed for Austrian fourth tier side FC Kitzbühel, helping them win the league, but left due to the Grenfell Tower fire in England.

He also works as a gardener.

International career

He is eligible to represent Kuwait, Jamaica, Italy, and Egypt internationally.

References

External links
 Tayshan Hayden-Smith at playmakerstats.com

Association football midfielders
English expatriate footballers
English expatriate sportspeople in Austria
English expatriate sportspeople in Cyprus
English footballers
English people of Egyptian descent
English people of Italian descent
English people of Jamaican descent
English people of Kuwaiti descent
Expatriate footballers in Austria
Expatriate footballers in Cyprus
Living people
Year of birth missing (living people)